Spain competed at the 2022 Winter Olympics in Beijing, China, from 4 to 20 February 2022.

The Spanish team consisted of ten men and four women competing in six sports.

On January 25, 2022, snowboarder Queralt Castellet and skeleton athlete Ander Mirambell were named as the Spanish flagbearers during the opening ceremony. Meanwhile, figure skater Adrián Díaz served as the country's flagbearer during the closing ceremony.

Medalists
The following competitors won medals at the games. In the by discipline sections below, medalists' names are bolded.

Competitors
The following is the list of number of competitors participating at the Games per sport/discipline.

Alpine skiing

Spain has qualified two male and one female alpine skier.

Cross-country skiing

Spain qualified three male and one female cross-country skiers, but will only use two male quotas.

Distance

Sprint

Figure skating

Based on placements at the 2021 World Figure Skating Championships in Stockholm, Sweden, Spain qualified 2 athletes (1 male and 1 female) in the  ice dancing event.

Laura Barquero failed the doping test, as announced after the closing of the Olympics.

Freestyle skiing

By meeting the basic qualification standards, Spain has qualified two male freestyle skier.

Men's

Skeleton

Based on placements of the World Ranking as of January 16, Spain qualified one male athlete.

Snowboarding

By meeting the basic qualification standards, Spain has qualified at least one male and one female snowboarder.

Freestyle

Snowboard cross

References

Nations at the 2022 Winter Olympics
2022
Winter Olympics